Northampton Borough Council was the borough council and non-metropolitan district responsible for local government in the large town of Northampton in England. In 2021 the council was abolished and succeeded by West Northamptonshire Council; a unitary authority, and the Northampton Town Council, a parish council.

The leader and cabinet model of decision-making had been adopted by the council. It consisted of 45 councillors, representing 33 wards in the town, overseen by a mayor, leader and cabinet. The main council building was Northampton Guildhall.

History
Northampton was granted its first town charter in 1189 by King Richard I and was permitted the appointment of a mayor in 1215 by King John. Northampton first existed as an ancient borough in medieval Britain before being one of the 178 boroughs to be reformed under the Municipal Corporations Act in 1835. Under the Local Government Act, it was then recognised as a county borough of 6 wards from 1898, 9 wards from 1900 and 12 wards from 1911. Northampton was granted modern borough status in 1974 under the Local Government Act 1972 as Northampton Borough Council, a non-metropolitan district council under Northamptonshire County Council.

Northampton was the most populous urban district in England not to be administered as a unitary authority, a status it failed to obtain in the 1990s local government reform. During the Local Government Commission for England (1992), Northampton was rejected from becoming a unitary authority because it was decided that "the separation of Northampton from its county would have a significant and detrimental effect." The government announced its acceptance of these recommendations in March 1996. In 2000, Northampton applied unsuccessfully for city status, held to celebrate the new millennium.

In March 2018, an independent report commissioned by the Secretary of State for Housing, Communities and Local Government, proposed structural changes to local government in Northamptonshire. These proposals saw the existing county council and district councils abolished and two new unitary authorities created in their place. One authority would consist of the existing districts of Daventry, Northampton and South Northamptonshire and the other authority would consist of Corby, East Northamptonshire, Kettering and Wellingborough districts.

Abolition and replacement
In 2021 the council was abolished and succeeded by West Northamptonshire Council; a unitary authority, and Northampton Town Council, a parish council. This was done, in part, due to failing a corruption probe into the disappearance of over £10M.

Governance
The leader and cabinet model of decision-making, adopted by the borough council under the Local Government Act 2000, is similar to national government. The council appointed the Leader (usually a member of the group with the political majority) and the Leader appointed up to five other councillors to serve on the cabinet. The cabinet members were responsible for different key areas of local governance including environment; community engagement; housing; planning, regeneration and enterprise; and finance.

The full council met various times during the year. The full council set the annual budget and the council's overall policies. It also had responsibility for amendments to the council's constitution and was responsible for appointing the leader, the executive, and the committees of the council.

Political control

Political control of the non-metropolitan district has been held by the following groups:

Arms

See also
List of Mayors of Northampton
Northamptonshire Credit Union

References

 
Former non-metropolitan district councils of England
Local authorities in Northamptonshire
2021 disestablishments in England
1974 establishments in England